Kunnamkulam is a municipal town situated in the Thrissur District of Kerala in India, spread over an area of 34.18 km2. It is an old commercial town, with an ancient history, famous for its printing and book binding industry. In the past, the town was called Kunnankulangara and references can be seen many British Archives about a neat and prosperous town which was predominantly Christian. Over the years Kunnamkulam has become a meeting point for all religions.

History

The history of Kunnamkulam turns back to the Paleolithic age. Kakkad cave and Chowannur cave support this fact. It is said that this place was part of 'Mahodaya Pattanam' and was known as 'Kunnamkulangare'.

Traditionally it is believed that a cross was installed by Thomas the Apostle, at Chattukulangara (a part of Arthat in Kunnamkulam). During the invasion of Tippu Sultan in 1789, the Christians from Chattakulangara migrated to Kunnamkulam town after the invitation from Thalapilli Rajas. The Thalapilli Rajas provided residences and places of workship.

Most of the oldest and wealthiest Christian families are to be found in Kunnamkulam. The Ashthagraha families(Cheeran, Pulikottil, Cheruvathoor, Mandumpal,  Kakkaserry, Cherukakkaserry, Koothoor, Porathoor and Kollannoor) along with Panakkal, Paramel, Thengungal, Moolapatt and Tholath were the most prominent among them. The ascendancy competition between these wealthy families, its contexture to literary activities opened new dimensions in the development of printing. Panakkal Chakku, Cheru, Thengungal Ittoop, Varu and Koothur Paramel Iyyu Uttoop were arbitrators of some of these families. It is said that the Christian families were settled earlier at Chattukulangare shifted to Kunnamkulam after the invasion of Tippu in 1789. They were invited by the Thalappilli Rajas, provided residences and places of worship. They resided on both sides of the street. This may have helped to avoid threat from Tippu against Thalappilli Rajas. Those settled on both sides of the street started trade and business, began a new era of transaction.

Kunnamkulam Municipal area was the headquarters of Talappilly taluk up to 1860 AD.

Geography
It has an average elevation of 57 metres (187 feet). It is around 23 km from Thrissur City and 10 km from Guruvayur. It is located on the route connecting Thrissur, Kochi to North Kerala.

Kunnamkulam, as the word connotes is the land of hills and ponds. The hills, 'Adupputty', 'Kizhoor' and 'Kakkad' lies in the borders and the ponds 'Enjhankulam', 'Ayyamkulam', and 'Madhurakulam' are in the middle. Manakulam, Cheralayam and Kakkad, the suburbs of Kunnamkulam were the seats of the Nambidis of Manakulam, Ayinikur and Kakkad Karanavappad respectively. They were collectively known as Thalappilli Rajas and belonged to three branches of the same dynasty.

Demographics
As of 2011 Census, Kunnamkulam had a population of 54,071 with 25,392 males and 28,679 females. Kunnamkulam had an average literacy of 96.8% higher than the state average of 94%; male literacy was 97.7% and female literacy was 96%.

Government
The Kunnamkulam Municipality was formed as an IVth grade Municipality in the year 1948. In 2000, it was further upgraded to a Grade-II Municipality by merging adjoining panchayats of Arthat (full) and panchayats of Porkulam and Chowwannur (parts). The municipality extended its area in 2001 and now has 31 wards. Kunnamkulam assembly constituency is part of Alathoor (Lok Sabha Constituency). Earlier, it was part of the Ottapalam Constituency.

Culture

Kadavallur, Chowannur and Arthat, the nearby places of Kunnamkulam had a rich cultural background. Kadavallur is well known throughout this coast as being the place where Nambudiris of the Thrissur and Tirunavaya Yogams compete for superiority in Vedic proficiency. In Chowannur, there was a Sabha Madom, an endowed college where Sanskrit education was given. Arthat was the chief center of Orthodox Christians. The Arthat St. Mary's Cathedral Church (Arthat Valliyapally) is the main church in the town. All these contributed a cultural rising up in the area which later on helped the development of the publishing industry. These published books were sold during Guruvayur Ekadasi. When the temple was open to all Hindus and a good amount of trade taken place at that time.

Line Houses 
A particular residential replica "line houses" (angadi pura (veeducal)), is seen in Kunnamkulam area. The streets of these houses are exceedingly narrow. The "Line Houses" are built in 3–5 cents of land on both sides of the street. The front room of the house functions as a shop while the rear room was used for residential purposes. There used to be rear yards for every so called "Angadi pura" (town house) which was used for processing of their agricultural products.

Kunnamkulam is famous for its religious harmony as Hindus, Christians and Muslims live here. The religious tolerance of Kunnamkulam people can be seen from the “Ambala Palli’(located at south Bazar) which is temple converted to a church where in, the temple character can be seen in the church entrance.

Archaeology
 Roman coins of Eyyal: Archaeologists have unearthed a collection of old Roman coins at Eyyal. These coins date from 123 BC to 117 AD. They are currently exhibited in the Archeological Museum of Thrissur.

See also
Places of worship in Kunnamkulam
Kanippayyur Shankaran Namboodiripad
 Pazhanji
 Pengamuck
 Pazhanji Church
 West Mangad

References

Cities and towns in Thrissur district